The 2022 New Mexico House of Representatives election took place on November 8, 2022 as part of the biennial United States elections. All 70 seats in the New Mexico House of Representatives were up for election. The election coincided with elections for other offices including the United States House of Representatives, governor, attorney general, and secretary of state. The primary election was held on June 7, 2022.

Predictions

Results Summary

Closest races 
Seats where the margin of victory was under 10%:
  
  gain
  gain
  gain
  
  
 
 
  gain
 
  
  gain

Retiring incumbents

Democrats 
District 17: Deborah Armstrong retired.
District 19: Kay Bounkeua retired.
District 23: Daymon Ely retired.
District 26: Georgene Louis retired.
District 47: Brian Egolf retired.
District 68: Karen Bash retired.

Independents 
District 66: Phelps Anderson retired.

Republicans 
District 2: James Strickler retired.
District 7: Kelly Fajardo retired.
District 38: Rebecca Dow retired to run for governor of New Mexico.
District 56: Zachary Cook retired.
District 64: Randal Crowder retired.

Incumbents defeated in primaries

Democrats
District 40: Roger Montoya lost renomination to Joseph Sanchez.

Republicans
District 51: Rachel Black lost renomination to John Block.

Newly created seats
District 17 (Bernalillo County)
District 23 (Sandoval County)

Detailed results

District 1
Incumbent Republican Rod Montoya has represented the 1st district since 2015.

District 2
Incumbent Republican James Strickler has represented the 2nd district since 2007. Strickler isn't seeking re-election.

District 3
Incumbent Republican Ryan Lane has represented the 3rd district since 2021.

District 4
Incumbent Democrat Anthony Allison has represented the 4th district since 2019. Christina J. Aspaas is challenging Allison for the Democratic nomination.

District 5
Incumbent Democrat Doreen Wonda Johnson has represented the 5th district since 2015. Kevin M. Mitchell is challenging Johnson for the Democratic nomination.

District 6
Incumbent Democrat Eliseo Alcon has represented the 6th district since 2009.

District 7
Incumbent Republican Kelly Fajardo has represented the 7th district since 2013. Fajardo isn't seeking re-election.

District 8
Incumbent Republican Brian Baca has represented the 8th district since his appointment in 2022.

District 9
Incumbent Democrat Patricia Lundstrom has represented the 9th district since 2003.

District 10
Incumbent Democrat Andrés Romero has represented the 10th district since 2015.

District 11
Incumbent Democratic  Majority Leader Javier Martínez has represented the 11th district since 2015. Adrian Anthony Trujillo Sr. and Lisa Meyer-Hagen are seeking the Republican nomination.

District 12
Incumbent Democrat Art De La Cruz has represented the 12th district since his appointment in 2022. Melissa D. Armijo and Nicole Michelle Olonovich are challenging Cruz for the Democratic nomination.

District 13
Incumbent Democrat Patricia Roybal Caballero has represented the 13th district since 2013.

District 14
Incumbent Democrat Miguel Garcia has represented the 14th district since 1997. 

After losing the election to Garcia by 3,600 votes, Peña claimed he was the victim of election fraud and refused to concede. On January 16, 2023, he was charged with hiring four men to shoot at the houses of four Democratic politicians (New Mexico House Speaker Javier Martínez, state Senator Linda M. Lopez, and two Bernalillo County commissioners) in December 2022 and January 2023.

District 15
The New 15th district includes the homes of incumbent Democrats Dayan Hochman-Vigil, who has represented the 15th district since 2019, and Deborah Armstrong, who has represented the 17th district since 2015. Armstrong isn't seeking re-election.

District 16
Incumbent Democrat Moe Maestas has represented the 16th district since 2007.

District 17
The new 17th District is an open seat with no incumbent. Darrell D. Deaguero and Cynthia D. Borrego are seeking the Democratic nomination. Ellis C. McMath and Joshua Taylor Neal are seeking the Republican nomination.

District 18
Incumbent Democrat Gail Chasey has represented the 18th district since 1997.

District 19
Incumbent Democrat Kay Bounkeua has represented the 19th district since her appointment in August 2021. Bounkeua isn't seeking re-election. Janelle Anyanonu, Colton Dean, and Eric Allen Sutton are seeking the Democratic nomination.

District 20
Incumbent Democrat Meredith Dixon has represented the 20th district since 2021.

District 21
Incumbent Democrat Debra Sariñana has represented the 21st district since 2017.

District 22
Incumbent Republican Stefani Lord has represented the 22nd district since 2021.

District 23
The new 23rd district is an open seat that is expected to favor Republicans. Most of constituents came from the former 44th district.

District 24
Incumbent Democrat Elizabeth Thomson has represented the 24th district since 2017.

District 25
Incumbent Democrat Christine Trujillo has represented the 25th district since 2013.

District 26
Incumbent Democrat Georgene Louis has represented the 26th district since 2013. Louis isn't seeking re-election. Cherise Quezada and Eleanor Chavez are seeking the Democratic nomination.

District 27
Incumbent Democrat Marian Matthews has represented the 27th district since 2020. Elisa Maria Martinez and Robert Godshall are seeking the Republican nomination.

District 28
Incumbent Democrat Pamelya Herndon has represented the 28th district since her appointment in June 2021.

District 29
Incumbent Democrat Joy Garratt has represented the 29th district since 2019. Adelious De Stith and Gregory Cunningham are seeking the Republican nomination.

District 30
Incumbent Democrat Natalie Figueroa has represented the 30th district since 2019.

District 31
Incumbent Republican Bill Rehm has represented the 31st district since 2007.

District 32
Incumbent Democrat Candie Sweetser has represented the 32nd district since 2017.

District 33
Incumbent Democrat Micaela Lara Cadena has represented the 33rd district since 2019.

District 34
Incumbent Democrat Raymundo Lara has represented the 34th district since 2019.

District 35
Incumbent Democrat Angelica Rubio has represented the 35th district since 2017.

District 36
Incumbent Democrat Nathan Small has represented the 36th district since 2017.

District 37
Incumbent Democrat Joanne Ferrary has represented the 37th district since 2017.

District 38
Incumbent Republican Rebecca Dow has represented the 38th district since 2017. Dow is retiring to run for Governor of New Mexico. The district has been drawn to be much more Democratic leaning than its predecessor. Tara Jaramillo and Ravi Bhasker are seeking the Democratic nomination. Melba Aguilar and Sandra Kay Hammack are seeking the Republican nomination.

District 39
Incumbent Republican Luis Terrazas has represented the 39th district since 2021. Former Representative Rodolpho Martinez and Karen Whitlock are seeking the Democratic nomination.

District 40
Incumbent Democrat Roger Montoya has represented the 40th district since 2021. Joseph Sanchez is challenging Montoya for the Democratic nomination.

District 41
Incumbent Democrat Susan Herrera has represented the 41st district since 2019. Marlo Martinez is challenging Herrera for the Democratic nomination.

District 42
Incumbent Democrat Kristina Ortez has represented the 42nd district since 2021. Florence Miera is challenging Ortez for the Democratic nomination.

District 43
Incumbent Democrat Christine Chandler has represented the 43rd district since 2019.

District 44
The new 44th district includes the home of incumbent Republican Jane Powdrell-Culbert, who has represented the 44th district since 2003, and incumbent Democrat Daymon Ely, who has represented the 23rd district since 2017. Ely isn't seeking re-election. Kathleen Cates and Frida Susana Vazquez are seeking the Democratic nomination.

District 45
Incumbent Democrat Linda Serrato has represented the 45th district since 2020.

District 46
Incumbent Democrat Andrea Romero has represented the 46th district since 2019. Ryan Salazar and Henry Roybal are challenging Romero for the Democratic nomination.

District 47
Incumbent Democratic House Speaker Brian Egolf has represented the 47th district since 2009. Egolf isn't seeking re-election.

District 48
Incumbent Democrat Tara Lujan has represented the 48th district since 2020.

District 49
Incumbent Republican Gail Armstrong has represented the 49th district since 2017.

District 50
Incumbent Democrat Matthew McQueen has represented the 50th district since 2015.

District 51
Incumbent Republican Rachel Black has represented the 51st district since 2019. John Block is challenging Black for the Republican nomination.

District 52
Incumbent Democrat Doreen Gallegos has represented the 52nd district since 2013.

District 53
Incumbent Democrat Willie Madrid has represented the 53rd district since 2019. Former Representative Ricky Little and Elizabeth Lee Winterrowd are seeking the Republican nomination.

District 54
Incumbent Republican Minority Leader Jim Townsend has represented the 54th district since 2015.

District 55
Incumbent Republican Cathrynn Brown has represented the 55th district since 2011.

District 56
Incumbent Republican Zachary Cook has represented the 56th district since 2009. Cook isn't seeking re-election.

District 57
Incumbent Republican Jason Harper has represented the 57th district since 2013.

District 58
Incumbent Republican Candy Ezzell has represented the 58th district since 2005.

District 59
Incumbent Republican Greg Nibert has represented the 59th district since 2017.

District 60
Incumbent Republican Joshua Hernandez has represented the 60th district since 2021.

District 61
Incumbent Republican Randall Pettigrew has represented the 61st district since 2021. Rebecca Jill Jones is challenging Pettigrew for the Republican nomination.

District 62
Incumbent Republican Larry Scott has represented the 62nd district since 2015. Elaine Sena Cortez is challenging Scott for the Republican nomination.

District 63
Incumbent Republican Martin Zamora has represented the 63rd district since 2019.

District 64
Incumbent Republican Randal Crowder has represented the 64th district since 2015. Crowder isn't seeking re-election.

District 65
Incumbent Democrat Derrick Lente has represented the 65th district since 2017.

District 66
Incumbent Independent Phelps Anderson has represented the 66th district since 2019. Anderson isn't seeking re-election.

District 67
Incumbent Republican Jackey Chatfield has represented the 68th district since 2019.

District 68
Incumbent Democrat Karen Bash has represented the 68th district since 2019. Bash isn't seeking re-election.

District 69
Incumbent Democrat Harry Garcia has represented the district since 2016.

District 70
Incumbent Democrat Ambrose Castellano has represented the 70th district since 2021. Anita Amalia Gonzales is challenging Castellano for the Democratic nomination.

Notes

References

External links

House
New Mexico House of Representatives elections
New Mexico House